Mariya Koryttseva and Ioana Raluca Olaru are the defending champions.
Lara Arruabarrena-Vecino and Ekaterina Ivanova won the title, defeating Janette Husárová and Renata Voráčová 6–3, 0–6, [10–3] in the final.

Seeds

Draw

Draw

References
 Main Draw

Torneo Internazionale Regione Piemonte - Doubles
Torneo Internazionale Regione Piemonte